David "Derek" Whiteford (born 13 May 1947 in Salsburgh) was a Scottish football player and manager. He played for Hibernian, Airdrieonians, Dumbarton and Falkirk.

Whiteford started his senior career with Hibernian, but was unable to establish himself in the first team and was given a free transfer. He signed for Airdrie and served the club with distinction, making over 400 total appearances including the 1975 Scottish Cup Final in which he was captain (lost to Celtic) as well as winning 1973–74 Scottish Division Two title and 1976 Spring Cup, plus another runner-up medal from the 1971–72 Texaco Cup. In 2016 he was voted into the Diamonds 'Greatest XI' by supporters.

After retiring as a player, Whiteford managed Albion Rovers, Dumbarton (alongside Alex Wright) and then Airdrieonians. He resigned as Airdrie manager in 1987 because he lost enjoyment for the game, and decided to concentrate on his then principal career as a physical education teacher.

Whiteford died in 2002, aged 54. His uncle Jock and cousins Davie and Jocky Whiteford (a teammate at Airdrie and Dumbarton) were also footballers.

Managerial statistics

References

1947 births
2002 deaths
Scottish footballers
Hibernian F.C. players
Airdrieonians F.C. (1878) players
Dumbarton F.C. players
Falkirk F.C. players
Albion Rovers F.C. managers
Airdrieonians F.C. (1878) managers
Scottish Junior Football Association players
Scottish Football League players
Association football midfielders
Scottish football managers
Footballers from North Lanarkshire
Dumbarton F.C. managers
Scottish Football League managers
Broxburn Athletic F.C. players
Scotland youth international footballers